Adrian Vizingr (born 19 April 1975) is a retired Czech football defender.

References

External links
 

1975 births
Living people
Czech footballers
FK Mladá Boleslav players
AFK Atlantic Lázně Bohdaneč players
FK Baník Most players
FK Pardubice players
FK Viktoria Žižkov players
Czech First League players
Association football defenders